, provisional designation: , is a resonant trans-Neptunian object and binary system, located in the outermost region of the Solar System. It was discovered on 26 December 2000, by astronomers with the Spacewatch survey at Kitt Peak Observatory near Tucson, Arizona. Its 75-kilometer sized companion was discovered by the Hubble Space Telescope in October 2002. , neither the primary body nor its satellite have been named.

Orbit and classification 

 orbits the Sun at a distance of 41.0–73.8 AU once every 434 years and 9 months (158,805 days; semi-major axis of 57.39 AU). Its orbit has an eccentricity of 0.29 and an inclination of 20° with respect to the ecliptic. The body's observation arc begins with its official discovery observation by Spacewatch on 26 December 2000. It last came to perihelion in 1979, and is currently at about 46.5 AU from the Sun, with an apparent magnitude of 21.54. It will reach aphelion in December 2197.

 is a resonant trans-Neptunian object that stays in a rare 3:8 mean-motion orbital resonance with Neptune, orbiting exactly three times the Sun for every 8 orbits Neptune does. Due to its relatively large distance to Neptune, a classification as an extended-scattered or detached object was also considered earlier on (Lykawka, 2006). However, improved observations and long-term numerical integrations of the object's orbit by Emel’yanenko and Kiseleva (84% probability) and the Deep Ecliptic Survey – with all alternative integrations in agreement, showing a minimum perihelion distance of 38.2 AU – have since secured its 3:8 orbital resonance with Neptune.

Numbering and naming 

This minor planet was numbered by the Minor Planet Center on 4 May 2004, receiving the number  in the minor planet catalog. , it has not been named. According to the established naming conventions, it will be given a mythological name associated with the underworld.

Physical characteristics 

Its IR spectral type transitions from the very red (RR) to the intermediate blue-red (BR). Alternatively a BR-spectral type has also been assumed. The object's B−V and V–R color indices have also been measured several times, giving an averaged value of close to 1.0 and 0.5, respectively, for a combined B−R magnitude of 1.50.

Diameter and albedo 

Satellite 

On 25 October 2002, observations in the far-infrared with the NICMOS instrument of the Hubble Space Telescope revealed that  is a binary system with a satellite in its orbit. The discovery was announced on 6 October 2005.

References

External links 
 Summary data for (82075), Small Bodies Data Ferret
 Asteroids with Satellites, Robert Johnston, johnstonsarchive.net
 Kuiper Belt Object Magnitudes and Surface Colors, Stephen C. Tegler (archived)
 List of Transneptunian Objects, Minor Planet Center
 

082075
082075
082075
20001226